The Hyundai Bayon is a five-door subcompact crossover SUV produced by the South Korean manufacturer Hyundai. Revealed in March 2021, it is Hyundai's smallest SUV in their European line-up and slots below the Kona. Designed for the European market, the vehicle's name is a reference to the French city of Bayonne. The Bayon is based on the third-generation i20 and is not offered with all-wheel drive.

Powertrain

Safety

Euro NCAP
The Bayon in its standard European configuration received 4 stars from Euro NCAP in 2021.

Sales

References

External links

  (UK)

Bayon
Cars introduced in 2021
Cars of Turkey
Mini sport utility vehicles
Crossover sport utility vehicles
Front-wheel-drive vehicles
Euro NCAP small off-road